Frida – Straight from the Heart is a 1991 Norwegian drama film directed by Berit Nesheim. The film was selected as the Norwegian entry for the Best Foreign Language Film at the 64th Academy Awards, but was not accepted as a nominee.

Cast
 Maria Kvalheim as Frida
 Ellen Horn as Bente
 Helge Jordal as Karl
 Andreas Bratlie as Kristian
 Cathrine Bang as Kaisa
 Kristian Mejdell Nissen as Martin
 Jan Hårstad as Teacher Skar

See also
 List of submissions to the 64th Academy Awards for Best Foreign Language Film
 List of Norwegian submissions for the Academy Award for Best Foreign Language Film

References

External links
 

1991 films
1991 drama films
Norwegian drama films
Films directed by Berit Nesheim
1990s Norwegian-language films